Tangier (also called Long Siding or Woodys Corner) is an unincorporated community in Liberty Township, Parke County, in the U.S. state of Indiana.

History
Tangier was platted in 1886. The community was named after Tangier, in Morocco. A post office was established at Tangier in 1886, and remained in operation until it was discontinued in 1994.

Geography

References

Unincorporated communities in Indiana
Unincorporated communities in Parke County, Indiana